In the Country (initiated in 2003 in Oslo, Norway) is a Norwegian Jazz trio comprising pianist Morten Qvenild, bassist Roger Arntzen and drummer Pål Hausken.

Biography 
The band was started by the three fellow students at the Norwegian Academy of Music in 2003. The year after they earned the "JazzIntro" Newcomer Award at Moldejazz (2004), and released their first album This Was The Pace of My Heartbeat (2004). The third album Without (2009) was named as "one of 2009's best jazz albums" by the All About Jazz reviewer John Kelman. In autumn of 2010 the band was on tour with vibraphonist and guitarist Andreas Mjøs under the auspices of Rikskonsertene, while in June 2011 they was on the fourth USA tour. samtidig som de slapp sitt fjerde album "Sounds and Sights" mottok strålende kritikker.

Band members 
Morten Qvenild (piano)
Roger Arntzen (bass)
Pål Hausken (drums)

Honors 
2004: "JazzIntro" Newcomer Awarded at Moldejazz, by Rikskonsertene and Norsk Jazzforum

Discography 
2004: This Was The Pace of My Heartbeat (Rune Grammofon
2006: Losing Stones, Collecting Bones (Rune Grammofon)
2009: Whiteout (Rune Grammofon)
2011: Sounds And Sights (Rune Grammofon), live album including a DVD
2013: Sunset Sunrise (ACT)
2014: Skogenes Sang (Grappa Music), with Frida Ånnevik
2015: Trail of Souls (ACT), with Solveig Slettahjell and Knut Reiersrud

References

External links 

In The Country at ACT Music
In The Country - Garana Jazz Festival 2013 on YouTube

Norwegian jazz ensembles
Norwegian experimental musical groups
Norwegian rock music groups
Musical groups established in 2003
2003 establishments in Norway
Musical groups from Oslo
Rune Grammofon artists